The Owensboro Transit System, is the primary provider of mass transportation in Daviess County, Kentucky. Eight routes traverse various urbanized sectors of the region.

Routes 
All routes meet downtown at the OTS Office.
Red Route through 2nd/4th Streets
Blue Route through 7th/9th Streets to Audubon Plaza
Yellow Route to Daymar and State Office Building
Brown Route through Frederica Street to Towne Square Mall and Target
Purple Route through Jr Miller Boulevard to Walmart
Orange Route through Triplett/Breckenridge Streets and New Hartford Road to Owensboro Community and Technical College and Regional Campus of the Western Kentucky University
Green Route to Commonwealth Plaza
White Route through 4th Street to Owensboro Health Regional Hospital

External links 
 

Bus transportation in Kentucky
Owensboro, Kentucky